Deroceras praecox is a species of small air-breathing land slug, a terrestrial pulmonate gastropod mollusk in the family Agriolimacidae.

Taxonomy
When Wiktor (1966) described D. praecox he distinguished two forms on the basis of their genitalia. Later Wiktor (1973) realised that one of the forms of D. praecox that he had distinguished was synonymous with Deroceras rodnae, described slightly earlier by Grossu & Lupu (1965). But the other form with a spiral end to its penis occupied a distinct range in the Sudeten mountains and neighboring areas; this is what is called D. praecox nowadays. It remains debatable whether D. praecox might be better viewed as a subspecies of D. rodnae (Hutchinson & Reise, 2009). Note that the distinct differences in mating behaviour between D. praecox and D. rodnae that Reise (1995) reported turn out to refer to differences between D. praecox and a more distant species, Deroceras juranum (Hutchinson & Reise, 2009).

Description

The coloration of the body of this slug is usually snowy white or off-white mottled with grey (Wiktor, 2000).
The head and tentacles are brownish. However, colour is often a misleading guide and identification should be based on dissection. Even within a site D. praecox may co-occur with other species that are indistinguishable externally (Reise & Hutchinson, 2001). Deroceras praecox is distinct in having a spiral pocket at the end of its penis .

Distribution
This species occurs in Eastern Europe. It is not listed in the IUCN red list - and thus is not evaluated (NE)

It occurs in:
 Czech Republic - near threatened (NT)
 Poland
 Slovakia
A closely related form of uncertain taxonomic status occurs in the uplands south of Dresden, Germany (Hutchinson & Reise, 2009).

This slug occurs in woodland.

References

Agriolimacidae
Gastropods described in 1966